Uyshu (Jaqaru for to liquify, melt, also spelled Uysho) is a  mountain in the Andes of Peru. It is situated in the Lima Region, Huarochirí Province, Huanza District. Uyshu lies northeast of Qullqi and southwest of the lakes named P'itiqucha and Saqsaqucha.

References 

Mountains of Peru
Mountains of Lima Region